Australian Sport Aviation Confederation is the governing body for the sport of Air sports in Australia.

History

Structure
The national body has eight state member associations:
Gliding Federation of Australia
Australian Parachute Federation
Hang Gliding Federation of Australia
Australian Aerobatic Club
Model Aeronautical Association of Australia

References

External links
 

Sports governing bodies in Australia
Air sports